Chaparro is a Spanish surname. Notable people with the surname include:

Aldo Chaparro (born 1965), Peruvian sculptor known for his works in stainless steel
Benigno Chaparro (born 1958), retired Paraguayan professional footballer
Cristián Chaparro (born 1975), former Argentine footballer
Ernesto Chaparro (1901–1957), Chilean football defender
Fernando Chaparro (born 1964), Argentine sprint canoeist
Janelee Chaparro (born 1991), Puerto Rican model and beauty queen
Jonathan Chaparro (born 1999), American social justice and civil rights activist.
Jorge Garbajosa Chaparro (born 1977), retired Spanish professional basketball player
Leandro Chaparro (born 1991), Argentine footballer
Mario Arturo Acosta Chaparro (1942–2012), Mexican Army general, shot dead in Mexico City
Nahuel Tetaz Chaparro (born 1989), Argentina international rugby union player
Omar Chaparro (born 1974), Mexican actor and media personality
Raúl Chaparro (born 1953), Argentine former footballer
Rolando Chaparro (born 1965), Paraguayan musician from Asunción
Francisco Chaparro Jara (born 1942), Spanish retired football forward and manager

See also
Chaparro prieto (Vachellia rigidula), a species of shrub or small tree in the legume family, Fabaceae
Guayacan Chaparro (Albizia pistaciifolia), a species of legume in the family Fabaceae
Caparo
Chapar (disambiguation)